The Five of Me is a 1981 made-for-television film about a man who is plagued with multiple personalities. It was directed by Paul Wendkos and produced by Jack Farren. It stars David Birney, Dee Wallace, Mitchell Ryan, John McLiam, James Whitmore Jr., Ben Piazza, Judith Chapman, Robert L. Gibson and Herb Armstrong.

Story
The story is about Henry Hawksworth (played by David Birney) who is in a struggle with four other personalities within him. Henry is shown as a child being threatened by his unbalanced father. The father (played by John McLiam) is threatening to castrate his son. Later Henry returns from South Korea and is a hero for saving a buddy. While he was there, Henry was imprisoned and had developed another personality to cope with things. This personality was Dana. Dana is a family man with conservative values. It is this personality that falls in love with a woman called Ann (played by Dee Wallace). Another personality is the violent and sociopathic Johnny. Then there is creative and childish Peter. There is also the protective and unemotional Phil. The Johnny personality commits a crime and goes to court where the multiple personalities of Henry come to light.

Background
The film is based on a real case of someone who suffered from multiple personality disorder. The book on which the film is inspired by, The Five of Me, was written by Henry Hawksworth with Ted Schwartz.

During the filming of this production an accident occurred on February 21, 1981. Camera assistant Jack Tandberg was killed on the set when he was struck by a driverless car.  This is also mentioned in Stuntwomen: The Untold Hollywood Story by Mollie Gregory where it suggests a lack of industry standards may have led to the deaths of three camera assistants between from 1980 to 1981.  In addition to Tandberg's death on The Five of Me, the other two deaths mentioned occurred on The Dukes of Hazzard and Magnum P.I..

Cast
David Birney as Henry Hawksworth  
Dee Wallace as Ann
Mitchell Ryan as Dr. Ralph B. Allison
John McLiam as Henry's Father
James Whitmore Jr. as Harry
Ben Piazza as Neurologist
Judith Chapman as Sally
Robert L. Gibson as Fred
Herb Armstrong as Bowling Alley Manager

References

External links
 
 Turner Classic Movies: The Five of Me
 New York Times: TV: "Five of Me" Multiple Personalities By John J. O'Connor

1981 films
1981 television films
American television films
Films directed by Paul Wendkos
Films about mental health